Cotachena heteromima is a moth in the family Crambidae. It was described by Edward Meyrick in 1889. It is found on New Guinea.

References

Moths described in 1889
Spilomelinae